Jonalyn Roxas Viray (born November 15, 1989), better known by her stage name, Jona, is a Filipino singer and actress. She was the first Pinoy Pop Superstar grand winner.

She was the lead singer of trio girl-group La Diva, alongside Maricris Garcia and Aicelle Santos following her career as a solo artist. The trio covered songs such as "I'm Yours", "Angels Brought Me Here", "Apologize" and "Stand Up for Love". They were chosen to sing the Philippine National Anthem at the Manny Pacquiao vs. Miguel Cotto boxing match in Las Vegas as well as the theme song of Philippine remake of the Mexican telenovela Rosalinda. Following the group's disbandment and her return as a solo artist she released her single "Help Me Get Over" which was awarded the 'Song of the Year' at the 6th PMPC Star Awards for Music.

In February 2016, Viray ended her decade-long exclusivity with GMA and transferred to ABS-CBN, changing her screen name to 'Jona'. On her first project in the Kapamilya Network, Jona sang "I Will Survive", the theme song of primetime drama series, We Will Survive. She also sang the second version of "I'll Never Love This Way Again" from the OST soundtrack of 2016 romantic-drama film Barcelona: A Love Untold and was chosen to sing the 65th Miss Universe theme titled "Confidently Beautiful".

Throughout her career as a member of La Diva and as a solo artist, Jona has won 9 Awit Awards, Aliw Awards, PMPC Star Awards for Music and World Championship of Performing Arts. Last 2018, Jona made Awit Award history as the first Filipino artist sweeping all digital categories – Most Downloaded Song for “You”, Most Downloaded Artist, Most Streamed Song for “Pusong Ligaw”, and Most Streamed Artist. Jona's self-titled album also bagged the “Best-Selling Album of the Year” award based on combined physical and digital sales.

She is known for her belting technique, melismatic singing style, and her ability to sing operatic arias. Viray is referred to as the "Philippines' Soul Princess" by multiple media and critics.

Early life
Jonalyn Roxas Viray was born on November 15, 1989 in Marikina, Philippines. She is the only girl and the eldest of 4 kids from Pio Duran, Albay. She started joining singing contests at an early age. She won first runner-up in Birit Bulilit of IBC 13 as a child and one of the finalists in MTB Teen Pop Star wherein her winning piece was Mariah Carey’s "Never Too Far". Growing up, Viray admired Carey, Regine Velasquez, Whitney Houston, Kyla, Christina Aguilera, and Beyoncé. Viray cites Kyla and Sarah Geronimo as her inspiration saying they "inspired [her] to get up there and do what they did". Currently, she is dubbed as The Fearless Diva of the Philippines.

Pinoy Pop Superstar
Jona was 15 years old when she competed at the singing competition Pinoy Pop Superstar held by the local television station GMA 7 and hosted by Regine Velasquez. Jona emerged as the weekly champion after singing the Whitney Houston hit song "Run to You". She also sang "Reflection", "I Have Nothing" and "Never Too Far" on the weeks that follow, and after four consecutive weeks of being weekly champion, she qualified to the grand finals.

For winning the title of, Jona won 1 million pesos in cash and became the owner of a Futura Classic house and lot developed by Filinvest and a brand-new Toyota Innova. She also won an exclusive one-year contract with GMA Records, the recording arm of GMA Network, and received 100,000 pesos worth of Belo Medical services, plus gift certificates worth 50,000 pesos from Gandang Ricky Reyes.

Career

Transfer to ABS-CBN
In February 2016, Jona ended her decade of exclusivity with GMA and transferred to rival network ABS-CBN. Part of her reintroduction was the changing of her screen name to "Jona". Her earliest project in the Kapamilya Network saw her competing in the 2016 edition of Himig Handog, a songwriting and music video competition and also singing "I Will Survive", the theme song of primetime drama series, We Will Survive.

From then on she has sung several theme songs for ABS-CBN films and drama series, became a mainstay of the longest noontime musical variety show ASAP, released her first album under Star Music which achieved Gold and Platinum certifications, held two major concerts, and competed and won second place in Himig Handog 2017. On the 31st Awit Award, Jona won 6 awards, Most Downloaded Artist, Most Streamed Artist, Most Downloaded Song for "You," Most Streamed Song for "Pusong Ligaw," People's Voice for Favorite Collaboration for "Till the End of Time" with BoybandPH and Best Selling Album of the Year for self-titled album "Jona." Her collaboration with Regine Velasquez, "Matibay," also won Best Musical Arrangement award for composer Marvin Querido.

ASAP Birit Queens
On May 15, 2016, ASAP launched a group called the ASAP Birit Queens. The group is composed of Jona, Morissette, Angeline Quinto and Klarisse de Guzman. The group held a concert on March 31, 2017 at the Mall of Asia Arena.

The group temporarily disbanded in late 2017, but has since reunited occasionally.

BillBoard Philippines 
On the launch of the Billboard Philippines, three of Jona's songs charted in Billboard Philippines Top 20. Her songs "You" "Pusong Ligaw" and "Maghihintay Ako", with "Pusong Ligaw" and "Maghihintay Ako" charting at number 3 and Number 4 respectively, all in the Top 5  and "You" charting at Number 9

24th ASIAN Television Awards 
Jona was called to perform for 2 Nights at the 27th Asian Television Awards when it happened for the first time in the Philippines. On the gala night, she performed a cover of "Somewhere Over The Rainbow" and "The Magic Flute "Queen of the Night aria" ("Der Hölle Rache kocht in meinem Herzen") On the artist's night, she performed "Love Don't Cost A Thing", "Into the Unknown", "Fifth Element Aria" and her own song "Till the End of Time".

YouTube Music Night 
Jona was chosen by YouTube Philippines to be the first Filipina to headline the YouTube Music Night for the whole of Southeast Asia.

Discography

Studio albums

Singles

Concerts
 Fearless (February 28, 2014, Music Museum)
 Journey into my Heart (November 27, 2015, Music Museum)
 Queen of the Night: Jona (November 25, 2016, Kia Theatre)
 ASAP Birit Queens (March 31, 2017, Mall of Asia Arena)
 Prima Jona (The Theatre at Solaire)
 The Aces (with Lani Misalucha and Darren Espanto) (March 30, 2019, Smart Araneta Coliseum)

Filmography

Television

Awards and nominations

References

External links
 Jonalyn Viray at iGMA.tv
 

1989 births
Filipino child actresses
Filipino child singers
Filipino women pop singers
Participants in Philippine reality television series
Sopranos
Living people
Filipino sopranos
People from Marikina
People from San Mateo, Rizal
Singers from Rizal
Actresses from Rizal
Singing talent show winners
GMA Network personalities
GMA Music artists
Star Music artists
Star Magic
ABS-CBN personalities
21st-century Filipino singers
21st-century Filipino women singers